The 2014 British Columbia Scotties Tournament of Hearts, the provincial women's curling championship for British Columbia, was held January 6 to 12 at the Prince George Golf & Curling Club in Prince George. The winning team represented the province at the 2014 Scotties Tournament of Hearts in Montreal.

Teams

Round robin standings
Final Round Robin Standings

Round robin results

Draw 1
Monday, January 6, 11:00 am

Draw 2
Monday, January 6, 6:30 pm

Draw 3
Tuesday, January 7, 11:00 am

Draw 4
Tuesday, January 7, 6:30 pm

Draw 5
Wednesday, January 8, 11:00 am

Draw 6
Wednesday, January 8, 6:30 pm

Draw 7
Thursday, January 9, 11:00 am

Draw 8
Thursday, January 9, 6:30 pm

Draw 9
Friday, January 10, 9:30 am

Tiebreakers

Round 1
Friday, January 10, 2:30 pm

Round 2
Friday, January 10, 5:30 pm

Round 3
Friday, January 10, 9:00 pm

Playoffs

1 vs. 2
Friday, January 10, 7:00 pm

3 vs. 4
Saturday, January 11, 10:00 am

Semifinal
Saturday, January 11, 7:00 pm

Final
Sunday, January 12, 5:00 pm

External links

Sport in Prince George, British Columbia
British Columbia 
British Columbia Scotties Tournament of Hearts